The 2014 Anaheim mayoral election was held on November 4, 2014 to elect the mayor of Anaheim, California. It saw the reelection of Tom Tait.

Municipal elections in California are officially non-partisan.

Results

References 

Anaheim
Mayoral elections in Anaheim, California
Anaheim